Visitors to Yemen must obtain a visa from one of the Yemeni diplomatic missions unless they come from one of the visa countries whose citizens may obtain 
visa on arrival. Until January 2010 Yemen had a visa on arrival policy for some 50 nations.

Visa policy map

Visa free
Citizens of  do not require a visa for up to 30 days.

Visa is not required for those of Yemeni origin if holding a genuine Yemeni identification document or a
proof of being of Yemeni origin. The origin can be proved by a birth certificate or any document from the
father who has Yemeni nationality.

Visa on arrival 
Citizens of the following 11 countries can obtain a visa on arrival for Yemen valid for up to 3 months:

Transit 
Passengers can transit without visa with a confirmed onward ticket for a flight to a third country within 24 hours. 
They must stay in the international transit area of the airport and have documents required for the
next destination.

Non-ordinary passports 
Holders of diplomatic or official/service/special passports of Cuba, Czech Republic, Djibouti, Ethiopia, Mauritania, Morocco, Pakistan, Turkey and holders of diplomatic passports of Lebanon, Hungary and holders of Palestine Authority VIP passport can obtain visa on arrival.

Israel 
Visitors holding Israeli visas (or other Israeli entry documents) are denied entry to Yemen.

Future 

Yemen held talks for implementing electronic visa system.

See also

Visa requirements for Yemeni citizens
Yemeni passport
Tourism in Yemen

References

Yemen
Foreign relations of Yemen